The El Pasaje (also known as the Cherokee Club) is a historic site in Ybor City, Tampa, Florida. It was originally built in 1886 to house the offices for Vicente Martinez Ybor's companies as he planned Ybor City and then ran his cigar factory and other businesses. El Pasaje has been home to many establishments since: a hotel, several restaurants, several bars and speakeasies, a military recruiting station, and newspaper offices, among others.

The two-story brick building is located at the corner of 14th Street (Avenida Republica De Cuba) and East 9th Avenue across the street from Ybor's original cigar factory, what is today Ybor Square. On November 15, 1972, it was added to the U.S. National Register of Historic Places.

References

External links
 Hillsborough County listings at National Register of Historic Places
 Florida's Office of Cultural and Historical Programs
 Hillsborough County listings
 El Pasaje Building
 Library of Congress Print and Photographs Online Collection, Cherokee Club, 1318 Ninth Avenue, Tampa, Hillsborough County, FL
 National Park Service, Ybor City article mentioning Vicente Ybor and Cherokee Club

Gallery

1886 establishments in Florida
Buildings and structures in Tampa, Florida
Cuban-American culture in Tampa, Florida
National Register of Historic Places in Tampa, Florida
Spanish-American culture in Tampa, Florida